Justine Triet (born 17 July 1978) is a French film director, screenwriter and editor. She is a graduate of the École nationale supérieure des Beaux-Arts. Her debut feature, Age of Panic, was presented as part of the ACID programme at the 2013 Cannes Film Festival.

Filmography

References

External links
 

1978 births
Living people
French film directors
French women film directors
French women screenwriters
French screenwriters
French film editors
French film producers
People from Fécamp
French women film editors